Fölsen is a small village in North Rhine-Westphalia, Germany with about 200 inhabitants. It is part of the town Willebadessen.

Location 
Fölsen is located in one of the sidevalleys of the river Nethe.

Attractions 
Fölsen is the head church of Niesen and Helmern.  It has a small pub, located at the village square, as well as a historic church.  The village features a fully operational volunteer fire brigade, which was to get a new Mercedes Benz firetruck in 2008, replacing their old 1983 Ford Transit.

Recreation 
Fölsen has a lot of different clubs and associations:
 SV Fölsen (sports club)
 FFW Fölsen (voluntary fire brigade)
 KLJB Fölsen (youth organisation)
 Männergesangsverein (male choral society)
 Blaubären Fölsen (fan club of the Bundesliga soccer team Schalke 04)
 Schnakkencrew (a not registered syndicate)
 Männerstammtisch (a not registered syndicate)

References 

Villages in North Rhine-Westphalia